Bright Nxumalo (born 3 March 1978) is a Swaziland international footballer who plays as a goalkeeper. As of February 2010, he plays for Eleven Men in Flight in the Swazi Premier League and has won four caps for his country.

External links

References

1978 births
Living people
Association football goalkeepers
Swazi footballers
Eswatini international footballers
Eleven Men in Flight players